Zachary Jordan "Zach" Bauman (born July 24, 1992) is an American football running back who is currently a free agent. He played college football for the Northern Arizona University Lumberjacks. He was considered one of the top running backs in FCS history, being one of only nine players to rush for 1,000+ yards four times .

Playing career

Northern Arizona
Baumann played college football for the Northern Arizona Lumberjacks in the NCAA Division I Football Championship Subdivision (FCS) from 2010 to 2013.  He was considered one of the top running backs in the FCS that year.  While at Northern Arizona, he rushed for at least 1,000 yards for all four years of his eligibility, including 1,456 yards and 10 touchdowns as a senior.  He was named to the first team in the Big Sky Conference three times.

Arizona Cardinals
The Arizona Cardinals signed Bauman to their practice squad on October 28, 2014. Bauman was cut by the Cardinals on November 11, 2014. He was re-signed to the practice squad on December 16, 2014. On May 5, 2015, he was released by the Cardinals.

In the preseason of 2014, Bauman scored a touchdown on what was called the "most bizarre TD of early NFL preseason" in a game against the Minnesota Vikings.  The play highlighted the rule that the center's snap to the quarterback is considered a backward pass and not a handoff, therefore the dropped ball was not a fumble and could be advanced.  Bauman picked up the ball from the turf and ran it six yards for a touchdown.

Bauman participated in The Spring League in 2017.

References

1992 births
Living people
American football running backs
Canadian football running backs
American players of Canadian football
Arizona Cardinals players
Edmonton Elks players
Northern Arizona Lumberjacks football players
The Spring League players
Sportspeople from Chandler, Arizona
Players of American football from Arizona